Brachymelecta californica is a species of cuckoo bee in the family Apidae, found in Central America and North America.

References

Further reading

 
 

Apinae
Articles created by Qbugbot
Insects described in 1878